Frederick Weber may refer to:

 Frederick Weber (fencer) (1905–1994), American fencer and pentathlete
 Frederick T. Weber (1916–1942), American naval aviator
 Frederick Theodore Weber (1883–1956), American painter, sculptor, and etcher
 Frederick Parkes Weber (1863–1962), English dermatologist
 Frederick Johann Weber (1881–1967), American photographer

See also
Fred Webber (Frederick John Webber; 1883–1966), Australian rules footballer
Fred Weber, American singer
Fred J. Weber (1919–2007), justice of the Montana Supreme Court